WDNY-FM (93.9 FM) is a radio station broadcasting a classic rock format. Licensed to Dansville, Livingston County, New York, United States. the station is owned by Genesee Media.

The station is located such that the broadcast at times reaches as far north as Pittsford, New York, to the Pennsylvania border to the south.

In 2003, WDNY-FM moved from its original location at 129 Main Street to a new office and studio at 195 Main Street. The new location is within a historic Main Street building and still contains the original ornate tin ceiling. On October 28, 2011, WDNY-FM changed hands from Miller Media Inc. to Genesee Media Corporation.

WDNY-FM is well known for its local service to the Genesee Valley, Western Finger Lakes, and Southern Tier areas of New York State.

WDNY-FM's Five-County News was broadcast live in the mornings with News Director Terry Van until his retirement on December 24, 2010. Since then, it has been broadcast by Robin Humphrey. The five-county news airs at 6:00, 7:00, 8:00 and at 12:00 PM, and in the afternoons at 5:00. Since the start of 2011, the news broadcasts have utilized more live quotes from local authorities and elected officials. Special programming at WDNY-FM includes the Wakeup Call, hosted weekday mornings by News Director Robin Humphrey and Bill Timberlake accompanied by Sports Director Frank Williams.

Live sporting events are covered on-location by Sports Director Frank Williams. In spring 2008, the station began live streaming of sporting events on their website. On Saturday mornings, the station hosts the Five-County News Weekend Edition, with Robin Humphrey, which includes breaking events and recaps of major news occurring in the area over the past work week.

Each year the station hosts a live on-air auction, allowing callers to place bids over the radio. This feature is usually held in the late winter.

On March 25, 2013, WDNY-FM changed its call letters to WMRV.

On February 22, 2017, WMRV changed its call letters back to WDNY-FM.

On December 18, 2017, WDNY-FM changed its format from adult to classic rock, branded as "Classic Rock 93.9." On January 28, 2018, it began airing the syndicated Pink Floyd program "Floydian Slip."

On March 11, 2019, Hold Fast Media, Inc. owned by Don MacLeod took over the operations of WDNY and WDNY-FM. On July 27, 2020, Hold Fast Media, Inc. returned the station to Genesee Media Corporation.

Previous logo

References

External links
WDNY-FM website

DNY-FM
Radio stations established in 1991
1991 establishments in New York (state)
Classic rock radio stations in the United States